Alpheopsis is a genus of shrimp of the family Alpheidae. Several species of the genus have been known to share the same burrows with members of different species. They are inhabitants of the Eastern Pacific Ocean.

Species
The genus includes the following species:

Alpheopsis aequalis Coutière, 1896
Alpheopsis africana Holthuis, 1952
Alpheopsis allanhancocki Wicksten, 1992
Alpheopsis azorica Anker, d'Udekem d'Acoz & Poddoubtchenko, 2005
Alpheopsis biunguiculata Banner, 1953:
Alpheopsis chalciope De Man, 1910
Alpheopsis chilensis Coutière, 1896
Alpheopsis cortesiana Wicksten & Hendrickx, 1986
Alpheopsis diabolus Banner, 1956
Alpheopsis equidactylus (Lockington, 1877)
Alpheopsis harperi Wicksten, 1984
Alpheopsis idiocarpus Coutière, 1908
Alpheopsis labis Chace, 1972
Alpheopsis shearmii (Alcock & Anderson, 1899)
Alpheopsis tetrarthri Banner, 1956
Alpheopsis trigona (Rathbun, 1901)
Alpheopsis trispinosa (Stimpson, 1860)
Alpheopsis undicola Banner & Banner, 1973
Alpheopsis vietnamensis Tiwari, 1964
Alpheopsis yaldwyni Banner & Banner, 1973

References

Alpheidae
Crustaceans of the eastern Pacific Ocean
Decapod genera